Pultusk was a  74-gun ship of the line of the French Navy.

Career 
Ordered on 24 April 1804 as Audacieux, the ship was one of the ships built in the various shipyards captured by the First French Empire in Holland and Italy in a crash programme to replenish the ranks of the French Navy. She took her definitive name Pultusk on 21 February 1807, though the order might not have been implemented until 14 May.

She was commissioned on 21 September 1807 and was part of the Escault squadron under Admiral Missiessy. She was ceded to Holland under the Treaty of Paris, and entered Dutch service as Waterloo being broken up in 1817.

Notes, citations, and references

Notes

Citations

References

Ships of the line of the French Navy
Téméraire-class ships of the line
1807 ships